Rhipidolestidae is a family of damselflies in the order Odonata, superfamily Calopterygoidea.

Genera
 Agriomorpha May, 1933
 Bornargiolestes Kimmins, 1936
 Burmargiolestes Kennedy, 1925
 Rhipidolestes Ris, 1912

References

Calopterygoidea
Odonata families